KDPS is a radio station in Des Moines, Iowa. The station is owned by Des Moines Public Schools. The school district programs the station with a variety of rock music styles and staffs it with high school students who are learning radio.

Children's programming

Kids Radio Mania is the station's weekend radio programming format.  Kids Radio Mania is produced by Professor Stephen Winzenburg at Grand View University and airs every Saturday from 5 a.m. to 5 p.m. central time and Sunday from 5 a.m. to 5 p.m. during summers and holidays, Sundays 5 a.m. to 5 p.m. during the school year.

Kids Radio Mania started in 1992 as a four-hour Saturday morning kids music format.  Originally produced on large one-hour reel-to-reel tapes, the format used the little amount of children's music that was available at the time.  The Saturday morning format lasted for three years, until a national children's radio format came to the Des Moines market on an AM station (which only lasted for a year).

The Kids Radio Mania format was revived as an all-weekend station on April 1, 2001.  From a small collection of children's CDs the station has grown to a library of over 600 CDs and airs pre-teen pop music, such as Hilary Duff, Aaron Carter, Raven, the A-Teens and Jesse McCartney.  It also plays many of the kids classics, such as Raffi, Barney, Mary-Kate and Ashley Olsen and Hampton the Hampster.

Shortly after the all-weekend format was started, the station was approached by local public television host Dan Wardell to start a weekly live children's call-in show. Crazy Dave's Kid Show started the first weekend of August in 2001 and has aired every Saturday morning at 10:30 since. The show receives calls from all over the world, including Sweden, Australia, New Jersey, New York, Oregon and California.

In 2006 KDPS started awarding the annual "Family Favorite Awards," given to children's recording artists for best album, best singer, best song and best album packaging.  Winners are listed on the KDPS website under the "kids radio" link.

Unlike the few other commercial children's radio stations in the United States, Kids Radio Mania is a non-commercial venture that does not air any inappropriate pop music.  The station also does not focus on simplistic guitar-and-vocalist songs but offers a wide variety of upbeat music material that the entire family can enjoy.  Each week about 30 songs are on the station's "hot" list of tunes played every three to four hours.  Another 120 songs are mixed in throughout the weekend and a featured artist is played hourly in the rotation.

Educational segments on Kids Radio Mania include hourly segments from past Crazy Dave's Kid Show, weekly historical information,  "the thesaurus forest,"  "the name all of fame,"  "animal adventures,"  "the state of the week,"  "the birthday buddy" and "the presidential profile."  Kids Radio Mania is a servicemark of Grand View University.

The station now airs all night from Friday to Monday morning.

See also
 KCBC-FM (defunct) (KDPS's predecessor)

References

External links

DPS
DPS
Radio stations established in 1953